Younghusband Ridge is located on the border of Alberta and British Columbia. It was named in 1927 by Alfred J. Ostheimer after  Lt. Col. Sir Francis Edward Younghusband.

See also
 List of peaks on the Alberta–British Columbia border
 Mountains of Alberta
 Mountains of British Columbia

References

Younghusband Ridge
Younghusband Ridge
Canadian Rockies